Seryat (Hirät) is a rural locality (a khutor) in Ishtuganovsky Selsoviet, Meleuzovsky District, Bashkortostan, Russia. The population was 8 as of 2010. There is 1 street.

Geography 
Seryat is located 49 km east of Meleuz (the district's administrative centre) by road. Verkhnebikkuzino is the nearest rural locality.

References 

Rural localities in Meleuzovsky District